Martin Herem (born 17 December 1973) is an Estonian general and the current Commander of the Estonian Defence Forces since 2018. 

Herem entered into service in 1992. From 2013 to 2016 he served as the Commandant of the Estonian National Defence College and from 2016 to 2018 Chief of Staff of the Headquarters of the Estonian Defence Forces. Herem was one of the re-founding members of the paramilitary Estonian Defence League in 1990.

On 24 January 2023, Martin Herem was promoted to the rank of general.

Military career
09.1992–06.1996 Estonian National Defence College, cadet
07.1996–02.1998 Kuperjanov Single Infantry Battalion, Platoon Leader
02.1998–07.1998 Kuperjanov Single Infantry Battalion, Company Executive Officer
07.1998–11.1998 Kuperjanov Single Infantry Battalion, S3 Staff Officer
11.1998–01.2000 Tartu Single Infantry Battalion, S3 Staff Officer
01.2000–07.2000 Tartu Single Infantry Battalion, S3 Staff Commander
07.2000–07.2001 Tartu Single Infantry Battalion, Staff Commander
08.2002–08.2003 Estonian National Defence College, Instructor of the Tactics Department
09.2003–02.2006 Estonian National Defence College, Head of the Tactics Department
02.2006–06.2006 Operation Iraqi Freedom II training mission Senior Staff Officer with US brigade
06.2006–04.2007 Estonian National Defence College, Head of the Tactics Department
04.2007–05.2008 Tapa Training Center, Staff Commander
06.2008–07.2012 North-Eastern Defence Command, Commander
07.2012–08.2013 Estonian National Defence College, Deputy Commander
08.2013–07.2016 Estonian National Defence College, Commandant
07.2016–12.2018 Headquarters of the Estonian Defence Forces, Chief of Staff
12.2018–... Commander of the Estonian Defence Forces

Awards, decorations, and recognition

Decorations and badges

Personal life

Martin Herem is married and has a son and two daughters. He is one of the grandchildren of Harri Moora. One of his hobbies is marathon running. He has participated in the organisation of the Järvakandi marathon. He is fluent in English and Russian as foreign languages. He is also one of the re-establishers of the Estonian Defence League in Rapla.

References 

|-

|-

|-
 

1973 births
Living people
People from Tallinn
Estonian lieutenant generals
Recipients of the Military Order of the Cross of the Eagle, Class II